Pawłówka may refer to the following places:
Pawłówka, Lublin Voivodeship (east Poland)
Pawłówka, Masovian Voivodeship (east-central Poland)
Pawłówka, Podlaskie Voivodeship (north-east Poland)